Tetracera is a genus of flowering plants of the Dilleniaceae family native to the tropics. Several species are lianas.

Species 
Plants of the World Online currently includes:

 Tetracera affinis Hutch.
 Tetracera akara (Burm.f.) Merr.
 Tetracera alnifolia Willd.
 Tetracera amazonica Kubitzki
 Tetracera arborescens Jack
 Tetracera asperula Miq.
 Tetracera billardierei Martelli
 Tetracera boiviniana Baill.
 Tetracera boomii Aymard
 Tetracera breyniana Schltdl.
 Tetracera bussei Gilg
 Tetracera costata Mart. ex Eichler
 Tetracera daemeliana F.Muell.
 Tetracera edentata H.Perrier
 Tetracera empedoclea Gilg
 Tetracera eriantha (Oliv.) Hutch.
 Tetracera fagifolia Blume
 Tetracera forzzae Fraga & Aymard
 Tetracera glaberrima Martelli
 Tetracera hirsuta (Miq.) Boerl.
 Tetracera hydrophila Triana & Planch.
 Tetracera indica (Christm. & Panz.) Merr.
 Tetracera kampotensis Gagnep.
 Tetracera korthalsii Miq.
 Tetracera lanuginosa Diels
 Tetracera lasiocarpa Eichler
 Tetracera leiocarpa Stapf
 Tetracera litoralis Gilg
 Tetracera macphersonii Aymard
 Tetracera macrophylla Hook.f. & Thomson
 Tetracera madagascariensis Willd. ex Schltdl.
 Tetracera maguirei Aymard & B.M.Boom
 Tetracera maingayi Hoogland
 Tetracera masuiana De Wild. & T.Durand
 Tetracera nordtiana F.Muell.
 Tetracera oblongata DC.
 Tetracera parviflora (Rusby) Sleumer
 Tetracera poggei Gilg
 Tetracera portobellensis Beurl.
 Tetracera potatoria Afzel. ex G.Don
 Tetracera rosiflora Gilg
 Tetracera rotundifolia Sm.
 Tetracera rutenbergii Buchenau
 Tetracera sarmentosa (L.) Vahl
 Tetracera scandens (L.) Merr.
 Tetracera sellowiana Schltdl.
 Tetracera stuhlmanniana Gilg
 Tetracera surinamensis Miq.
 Tetracera volubilis L.
 Tetracera willdenowiana Steud.
 Tetracera xui H.Zhu & H.Wang

References

External links 
 
  PhytoImages image, phylogeny, nomenclature for Tetracera 
 Tetracera in A Catalogue of the Vascular Plants of Madagascar
 Species list
 Tetracera loureiri - One of the most valued herbs in Thai traditional medicine.
 A new species of Tetracera (Dilleniaceae) from Guyana
 Flora of China 12: 331–332. 2007

 
Eudicot genera